David Amuzu (born 23 August 1998) is a Ghanaian professional footballer who plays as a midfielder for Ghanaian Premier League side Accra Great Olympics. He is a graduate of Attram De Visser Soccer Academy.

Career

Attram De Visser 
Amuzu previously played for Attram De Visser Soccer Academy. He joined Accra Great Olympics on a 1-year loan deal ahead of the 2017 Ghana Premier League.

Great Olympics 
In 2017, ahead of the 2017 Ghana Premier League, Amuzu was signed on a 1 year long loan deal by then Godwin Attram along with nine other players including Christopher Nettey and Godfred Odametey.

He made his debut during the first match of the season on 18 February 2021, coming on at half time for Emmanuel Cudjoe in a 3–1 match against Ashanti Gold. On 15 March 2017 in 1–1 draw game International Allies, he scored with an assist from Bernardinho Osah. He featured in 5 league matches within the season. He returned to Attram De Visser at the end of the season. In 2019, he was signed again by Accra Great Olympics ahead of the 2019–20 Ghana Premier League. He featured in 4 league matches the league was put on hold and later cancelled due to the COVID-19 pandemic. With the league set to resume for the 2020–21 Ghana Premier League, he was named on the club's squad list for the season.

References

External links 

 

Living people
1998 births
Association football midfielders
Ghanaian footballers
Attram De Visser Soccer Academy players
Accra Great Olympics F.C. players
Ghana Premier League players